The 2009 Ukrainian Cup Final was a football match that took place at the Dnipro Stadium on May 31, 2009. The match was the 18th Ukrainian Cup final and it was contested by Shakhtar Donetsk and Vorskla Poltava. The 2009 final was the first time a Ukrainian Cup final was held in Dnipropetrovsk. Vorskla Poltava, as Ukrainian Cup winners, qualified for the UEFA Europa League play-off round.

Road to Dnipropetrovsk 

All sixteen Ukrainian Premier League clubs did not have to go through qualification to get into the competition, so Vorskla and Shakhtar both qualified for the competition automatically.

Previous encounters 
Prior to the final, Vorskla and Shakhtar had met six times in previous Ukrainian Cup competitions. Vorskla had never defeated Shakhtar, with its best performance being a 1–1 draw in the second leg of the quarter-finals in the 2007–08 edition. Shakhtar's best performance against Vorskla was in a second round encounter in the 1994–95 edition, an 8–0 drubbing.

Match details

Match statistics

See also
 2008–09 Ukrainian Cup
 2008–09 Ukrainian Premier League

References

External links 

Cup Final
Ukrainian Cup finals
Ukrainian Cup Final 2009
Ukrainian Cup Final 2009
Sport in Dnipro
May 2009 sports events in Ukraine